David Gilbert Booth (born  1946) is an American businessman, investor, and philanthropist. He is the executive chairman of Dimensional Fund Advisors, which he co-founded with Rex Sinquefield.

Career
Booth graduated from Lawrence High School in Lawrence, Kansas and then received a B.A. in economics in 1968 and an M.S. in business in 1969 from the University of Kansas, also located in Lawrence.
He then enrolled at the University of Chicago Graduate School of Business in 1969 as a doctoral student, leaving in 1971 with an M.B.A. degree. He was a research assistant to Eugene Fama, and he met his future business partner, Rex Sinquefield, at the school.

He has published research articles including "Diversification Returns and Asset Contributions" with Eugene Fama. The article won the 1992 Graham and Dodd Award of Excellence from the Financial Analysts Journal.

David Booth has served on institutional boards, including as a governor of the Kravis Leadership Institute and the UCLA Foundation; as a trustee of the American Academy in Rome and the Paintings Conservation Council of the J. Paul Getty Trust; as a trustee of the University of Chicago; as a member of the board of directors of Georgetown University; and as a trustee of the University of Kansas Endowment Association.

According to Forbes, he had a net worth of $2 billion in August 2021.

Philanthropy

David Booth and his ex-wife, Suzanne Deal Booth, focused their philanthropy efforts on educational institutions and art restoration projects. In 1998 Suzanne Booth created the Friends of Heritage Preservation, which acts as a rapid response team for art preservation initiatives, whose area of focus ranges from entire historical sites to single works of art. 

In 1999, the Booths gave $10 million for construction of the Charles M. Harper Center building on the University of Chicago campus. 

The Booths gave $9 million to the University of Kansas in 2004 to fund the Booth Family Hall of Athletics attached to Allen Fieldhouse.

The Booth family pledged $300 million in November 2008 to the University of Chicago's Graduate School of Business, where he earned an MBA in 1971. He is a trustee of the university, and the Graduate School of Business is now named The University of Chicago Booth School of Business. The gift of cash and stock is being spread over a period of years, and is dedicated to furthering the school's publications, international presence, research centers, and faculty professional development. 

In 2010, the Booths acquired Dr. James Naismith's original 1891 copy of the 13 basic rules at auction for $3.8 million (laying out a total of $4,338,500 for the rules, auction house fees, and buyer's premium) with the intention of donating them to his alma mater the University of Kansas. Kansas University is known as the Cradle of Basketball because Naismith and his protégé Dr. Forrest C. "Phog" Allen, the Father of Basketball Coaching, coached at KU and helped it mature into the sport as it is known today. The purchase price set a world record for sports memorabilia.  The purchase of this historical artifact was documented in the 2012 ESPN 30 for 30 film There's No Place Like Home.

The Booth Center for Special Collections at Georgetown's Lauinger Library, which contains a number of archival documents related to Georgetown as well as an extensive collection of rare books, manuscripts, and art, was funded by a $3 million donation from the Booths.

In September 2017, Booth announced a donation of over $50 million to renovate the University of Kansas football team's stadium. The school renamed the stadium in his honor for the donation.

In 2019, Booth pledged a $10 million gift to The University of Texas at Austin to support construction of the Giant Magellan Telescope.

References

External links
Chicago Booth School of Business
Dimensional Fund Advisors
David Booth Interviews      

1946 births
Living people
20th-century American businesspeople
21st-century American businesspeople
21st-century philanthropists
American billionaires
American financial analysts
American financial company founders
American financiers
American investors
American philanthropists
Businesspeople from Kansas
Georgetown University people
Giving Pledgers
People from Lawrence, Kansas
University of Chicago Booth School of Business alumni
University of Chicago people
University of Kansas alumni